Al-Mahdī Aḥmad ibn Yaḥyā, or Aḥmad ibn Yaḥyā Ibn al-Murtaḍā (1363/1374 – 1436), was a Muʿtazila scholar and imam of the Zaidī state in Yemen who briefly held the imamate in 1391–1392.  He was an encyclopedist and a prolific writer on a range of subjects.

Aḥmad ibn Yaḥyā was a 12th-generation descendant of the Zaidī imām ad-Da'i Yusuf (d. 1012). His full name was: al-Mahdī Aḥmad ibn Yaḥyā ibn al-Murtaḍā ibn Aḥmad al-Jawad ibn al-Murtaḍā ibn al-Mufaḍḍal ibn al-Manṣūr ibn al-Mufaḍḍal ibn al-Ḥajjāj ibn Alī ibn Yaḥyā ibn al-Qāsim ibn al-Da'ī Yūsuf.

In 1391, when the elderly imām al-Nasir Muhammad Salah al-Din died, his sons were still minors. The qāḍī, ad-Dawwarī, took temporary administration of the Zaidī domains of highland Yemen, in their name. However, the Zaidi ulema assembled in the Jamal ad-Dīn Mosque in San'a and appointed Aḥmad ibn Yaḥyā imām under the title 'al-Mahdī Aḥmad'. The appointment was not recognised by ad-Dawwani, who immediately appointed the deceased imām's son al-Mansur Ali bin Salah ad-Din. Al-Mahdī Aḥmad and his followers withdrew from San'a to Bayt Baws, and for one year the two imāms fought for supremacy. In 1392, al-Mahdī Aḥmad was captured by al-Manṣūr Alī's forces and imprisoned. In 1399, aided by prison guards, the ex-imām escaped to live in privacy until his death from plague in 1436. Although al-Mahdī Aḥmad lacked the requisite administrative and military skills for the Zaydiyyah imamate, he produced a substantial body of writings on dogmatics, logic, poetry, grammar and law.

His sister Dahma bint Yahya was also a scholar and poet. The famous Salafi scholar Muhammad Al-Shawkani wrote Al-Sayl al-jarrar, a denunciation of a text written by the Zaydi Imam Al-Mahdi Ahmad bin Yahya.

Works
Kitāb al-Baḥr al-zahhār: al-jāmiʻ li-madhāhab ʻulamāʼ al-amṣār; a theological-legal encyclopedia
Kitāb al-milal wa al-niḥal: min ajzāʼ Kitāb al-baḥr al-zakhār: al-jāmiʻ li-madhāhab ʻulamāʼ al-amṣār
Ṭabaqāt al-Mu'tazilah
Bāb dhikr al-Muʻtazilah: min Kitāb al-Munyah wa-al-amal fī sharḥ kitāb al-Milal wa-al-niḥal
Al-Mutazilah: being an extract from the Kitābu-l milal wa-n-niḥal
Al-Kāshif li-dhawī al-ʻuqūl ʻan wujūh maʻānī al-kāfil bi-nayl al-suʼūl
Kitāb al-Munya wa-'l-amal fī sharḥ al-milāl wa-'n-niḥal
ʻUyūn al-Azhār fī fiqh al-aʼimmah al-aṭhār

See also

 Imams of Yemen
 Rassids
 History of Yemen

References

1363 births
1436 deaths
14th-century biographers
14th-century historians of the medieval Islamic world
14th-century religious leaders
14th-century Yemeni people
15th-century biographers
15th-century historians of the medieval Islamic world
15th-century Yemeni people
Zaydi imams of Yemen
Encyclopedists of the medieval Islamic world
Year of birth uncertain
14th-century Arabs
15th-century Arabs